Predrag Alempijević (born 23 December 1970) is a former Serbian football player.

References

1970 births
Living people
Serbian footballers
FK Mladost Lučani players
FC Elista players
Serbian expatriate footballers
Expatriate footballers in Russia
Russian Premier League players

Association football defenders